The Summer of Love usually refers to the summer of 1967.

Summer of Love may also refer to:
 Second Summer of Love, the summers of 1988 and 1989 in the UK

Music

 Summer of Love (album), an album by Koda Kumi
 "Summer of Love" (The B-52's song), 1986
 "Summer of Love" (Cascada song), 2012
 "Summer of Love" (Dannii Minogue song), 2015
 "Summer of Love" (Lonyo song), 2000
 "Summer of Love" (Shawn Mendes and Tainy song), 2021
 "Summer of Love" (Steps song), a 2000 double A-side single with "When I Said Goodbye"
 "Summer of Love", a song by U2 from Songs of Experience
 "Summer of Love", a song by Baha Men from Who Let the Dogs Out
 "Summer of Love", a song by Leah Haywood from Leah
 "Summer of Love", a song by Helen Hoffner from Wild about Nothing

Other
 Summer of Love (novel), by Lisa Mason
 Summer of Love: The Making of Sgt. Pepper, a 1993 book by George Martin on the making of the 1967 Beatles album
 Summer of Love (audio drama), a British audio drama
 "Summer of Love" (Sliders), an episode of the television program Sliders

See also 
 Summer Love (disambiguation)
 "Summer Time Love"